Herbert Donald Oyler (March 8, 1907 – September 19, 1989) was a Canadian curler. He was the skip of the 1951 Brier Champion team, representing Nova Scotia. It was the first time a team went undefeated at the Brier.

Oyler did not curl competitively after winning the 1951 Brier due to a sore wrist, which affected his delivery.

References

Brier champions
1907 births
1989 deaths
Curlers from Nova Scotia
People from Kentville, Nova Scotia
Canadian male curlers